Margaret of Bohemia (21 February 1296 – 8 April 1322) was a daughter of Wenceslaus II of Bohemia and his first wife, Judith of Habsburg.

Biography
In 1308, Margaret married Bolesław III the Generous. The betrothal had been her father's doing.

Since Bolesław's arrival at the Bohemian court and after his betrothal to Margaret, the King clearly favored him; this attitude caused fear between the closest male relatives of the King, who saw the young Duke of Legnica as a potential rival for the throne. Although Wenceslaus II had a son who seemed to render him irrelevant, the sudden death of the King in 1305 and one year later the murder of his son and successor Wenceslaus III in Olomouc gained him an unexpected importance. Bolesław began his fight for the Bohemian throne taking the title of "haeres Regni Poloniae" (heir of the Polish Kingdom).

The throne of Bohemia passed to Henry of Carinthia, who was married to Margaret's eldest sister, Anna of Bohemia. Henry and Anna were only on the throne for a year before Rudolf of Habsburg overthrew them. He married Elisabeth Richeza of Poland; who was Margaret's stepmother. By 1307, Rudolf had died so Henry and Anna were invited back but were still not secure. They turned their attentions to Margaret and Anna's sister Elisabeth. Elisabeth was young and unmarried, Anna and Henry wanted her to marry Otto of Löbdaburg for political reasons but Elisabeth refused. Instead, Elisabeth married John of Luxembourg who overthrew Henry and Anna once and for all. They went to live in Carinthia were Anna died in 1313, childless. John and Elisabeth became King and Queen of Bohemia. They had many children - among them were Charles IV, Holy Roman Emperor and Bonne of Bohemia; by now any chances of Bolesław and Margaret becoming King and Queen of Bohemia were gone.

Margaret died one day after giving birth to her youngest child. Bolesław remarried in 1326, taking Katarina Šubić (d. bef. 5 March 1358) as his second wife.

Issue
Margaret and Boleslaw had three children:
Wenceslaus I (b. ca. 1318 – d. 2 June 1364).
Louis I the Fair (b. ca. 1321 – d. 6/23 December 1398).
Nikolaus (b. and d. Hradec Králové, 7 April 1322).

See also
 Přemyslid dynasty

References

1296 births
1322 deaths
Bohemian princesses
Přemyslid dynasty
Piast dynasty
Polish princesses
Deaths in childbirth
13th-century Polish women
13th-century Bohemian women
13th-century Polish people
13th-century Bohemian people
14th-century Polish women
14th-century Polish people
14th-century Bohemian people
14th-century Bohemian women
Daughters of kings